Fares Jumaa Hasan Jumaa Al Saadi (born 30 December 1988) is an Emirati footballer who plays as a defender for Al-Wahda. He played for the United Arab Emirates national football team in the 2010 FIFA World Cup qualifying rounds.

International goals

References

External links

  Faris Statistics At Goalzz.com

1988 births
Living people
Emirati footballers
United Arab Emirates international footballers
Al Ain FC players
Al Jazira Club players
Al Wahda FC players
2011 AFC Asian Cup players
2019 AFC Asian Cup players
UAE Pro League players
Association football defenders